Lonesome Ladies is a 1927 American comedy film directed by Joseph Henabery and written by Winifred Dunn. The film stars Lewis Stone, Anna Q. Nilsson, Jane Winton, Doris Lloyd, Edward Martindel and Fritzi Ridgeway. The film was released on July 3, 1927, by First National Pictures.

Cast      
Lewis Stone as John Fosdick
Anna Q. Nilsson as Polly Fosdick
Jane Winton as Mrs. St. Clair
Doris Lloyd as Helen Wayne
Edward Martindel as Motley Hunter
Fritzi Ridgeway as Dorothy
De Sacia Mooers as Bee
E. H. Calvert as Mr. Burton 
Grace Carlyle as Mrs. Burton 
Fred Warren as Butler

References

External links
 

1927 films
1920s English-language films
Silent American comedy films
1927 comedy films
First National Pictures films
Films directed by Joseph Henabery
American silent feature films
American black-and-white films
1920s American films